Ramakrishnan Nagaraj (born 1953) is an Indian biochemist, molecular biologist and the leader of a team of scientists working in the field of peptide biochemistry at Centre for Cellular and Molecular Biology (CCMB). He is known for his studies on hemolytic and antibacterial properties in synthetic analogs of bacterial toxins. He is a J. C. Bose National fellow of the Department of Science and Technology at CCMB and an elected fellow of the Indian Academy of Sciences, National Academy of Sciences, India and the Indian National Science Academy. The Council of Scientific and Industrial Research, the apex agency of the Government of India for scientific research, awarded Nagaraj the Shanti Swarup Bhatnagar Prize for Science and Technology, one of the highest Indian science awards, in 1994, for his contributions to biological sciences.

Biography 
Born on 10 February 1953, Ramakrishnan Nagaraj graduated in science from the University of Mumbai and completed his master's degree at the Indian Institute of Technology, Mumbai before doing his doctoral research at the Indian Institute of Science under the guidance of Padmanabhan Balaram, a noted biochemist and Padma Bhushan laureate. Nagaraj joined the Centre for Cellular and Molecular Biology (CCMB) in 1980 as a scientist where he heads a team of scientists and pursues his researches on structure-function correlations in peptide antibiotics. He has done considerable work on signal peptides and peptide antibiotics and their structure-function relationships. Nagaraj is known to have suggested a protocol by which hemolytic and antibacterial properties of the synthetic analogs of bacterial toxins could be separated, an invention which is reported to be of assistance in designing antibiotic peptides. His researches have been documented in several articles; PubMed, an online repository of medical articles, has listed 273 of them.

Awards and honors 
The Indian National Science Academy awarded Nagaraj the Young Scientists Medal in 1981 and he held the Young Associateship of the Indian Academy of Sciences from 1985 to 1988. He received the Young Scientist Award of the Council of Scientific and Industrial Research (CSIR) in 1988; CSIR would honor him again in 1994 with the Shanti Swarup Bhatnagar Prize, one of the highest Indian science awards, in 1994. A Homi Bhabha Fellow of 1991, Nagaraj is also a recipient of the 1995 P. B. Rama Rao Award of the Society for Biological Chemists, India and an elected fellow of the Indian National Science Academy (1998), Indian Academy of Sciences (1992) and the National Academy of Sciences, India.

Selected bibliography

See also 
 Arthropod defensin
 Padmanabhan Balaram

References 

Recipients of the Shanti Swarup Bhatnagar Award in Biological Science
1953 births
Indian biochemists
Indian molecular biologists
Indian scientific authors
Fellows of the Indian Academy of Sciences
Fellows of The National Academy of Sciences, India
Fellows of the Indian National Science Academy
University of Mumbai alumni
IIT Bombay alumni
Indian Institute of Science alumni
Living people
20th-century Indian biologists
Scientists from Andhra Pradesh